"The Raven" is a narrative poem by Edgar Allan Poe.

The Raven may also refer to:

Characters
 The Raven (characters), a fictional band of mercenaries in works by James Barclay
 The Raven, a character in Princess Tutu
 The Raven, a character in Empires & Allies

Film and television 
 The Raven (1915 film), a silent movie by Charles Brabin
 The Raven (1935 film), a horror film starring Boris Karloff and Bela Lugosi
 The Raven (1963 film), a horror/comedy film starring Vincent Price, Boris Karloff, and Peter Lorre
 The Raven (2006 film), a horror film by Ulli Lommel
 The Raven (2012 film), a film by James McTeigue starring John Cusack
 The Raven (2007 film), a film by David DeCoteau
 "The Raven" (Star Trek: Voyager), a 1997 episode of Star Trek: Voyager
 "The Raven" (The Simpsons), a segment of The Simpsons episode "Treehouse of Horror"
 Highlander: The Raven, a TV series
 Kagagi or Kagagi: The Raven, a TV series on APTN Kids

Literature 
 "The Raven" (Brothers Grimm), a fairy tale collected by the Grimm Brothers
 "The Raven" (Italian fairy tale), a literary fairy tale by Giambattista Basile
 "The Raven", a 1798 poem by Samuel Taylor Coleridge

Music 
 The Raven (Lou Reed album), or its title song
 The Raven (The Stranglers album), or its title song
 "The Raven" (song), a 1976 song by the Alan Parsons Project from Tales of Mystery and Imagination
 "The Ravens", a song by Bathory from Blood on Ice
 The Raven, a 1971 composition for narrator and orchestra by Leonard Slatkin

Other uses
 The Raven: Anarchist Quarterly, an anarchist review produced by Freedom Press
 The Raven, the Cherokee chief also known as Savanukah
 The Raven (paintings) a series of paintings by Nabil Kanso
 The Raven (roller coaster), a roller coaster at Holiday World
 The Raven (Harold Kionka), pioneer of Internet TV and web television
 The Raven: Legacy of a Master Thief, a point-and-click video game by King Art Games
 The Raven, a pseudonym of Sam Houston

See also
 Le Corbeau (The Raven), a 1943 noir film starring Pierre Fresnay and Ginette Leclerc
 Raven (disambiguation)